is a Japanese bobsledder. He competed at the 1988, 1992, 1994 and the 1998 Winter Olympics.

References

1964 births
Living people
Japanese male bobsledders
Olympic bobsledders of Japan
Bobsledders at the 1988 Winter Olympics
Bobsledders at the 1992 Winter Olympics
Bobsledders at the 1994 Winter Olympics
Bobsledders at the 1998 Winter Olympics
Sportspeople from Shiga Prefecture
20th-century Japanese people